Lun Gywe (born 24 October 1930) is a Burmese painter who works in oil and watercolor. Outside of Myanmar his work has been exhibited, often in solo shows, in Japan, the Republic of Korea, the People's Republic of China, Australia, New York City, the Republic of Singapore.

Life
Lun Gywe was born in Yangon, Myanmar on 24 September  1930, and was raised by his mother after his father died when he was five months old. From an early age he spent much of his time drawing. He studied under Thet Win, Chit Maung, San Win, Thein Han (painter) and Ngwe Gaing, and graduated from the Art Institute of Teacher's Training in 1954. He was an instructor at the State School of Fine Arts, Yangon (1958–1979) and principal of this school (1977–1979). He also taught at the Fine Art association the University of Rangoon (1960–1979).

He studied in China in 1964, and was awarded a fellowship in art restoration to East Germany in 1971. His year-long stay in China had a strong influence, and he incorporated the Chinese brush and ink techniques into his oils and watercolors. The course in east Germany let him study European masters in East Berlin, Dresden and Potsdam and confirmed his love of impressionism. However, his greatest influence has probably been Thein Han, under whom he studied and with whom he retained a close relationship in his later life.

Work
Lun Gywe has been described as the greatest living Burmese painter. Lun Gywe began painting in a realistic and naturalistic vein, influenced by the major painters of the Rangoon School, Ba Nyan, Ngwe Gaing, San Win, and Thein Han who was his painting master. Over time, his works became more impressionistic and some of the works today might be called expressionistic. His exposure to rapidly executed Chinese ink and watercolor painting during his trip to China seems to have influenced his impressionistic work as he paints quickly and he is extremely prolific. His impressionistic work has been called "the action of impressionism". Of his Impressionist style, he has said, "I paint according to my emotions, drawing inspiration from smell and textures, light and shadow" An important part of his work focuses on the female form, his favourite subject.
A strong believer in Buddhism, his work is unified by his devotion to the principles embodied in that religion of order, harmony, stability and grace. He has said "I find inspiration in calmness. I cannot create a good painting when in an unsettled frame of mind. I often meditate before I start a painting".

Museum Collections
 National Museum of Myanmar
 Singapore Art Museum
 National Art Gallery (Malaysia)

See also
 Ngwe Gaing
 San Win
 Thein Han (painter)

References

Further reading
 

Living people
Burmese painters
Burmese artists
1930 births
People from Yangon
Academic staff of the University of Yangon
Buddhist artists